Number One is a small rural locality in the Mid North Coast region, located within the Mid-Coast Council local government area of New South Wales, Australia.

At the 2016 census, the town reported a resident population of 27. The median age is 32.

The Nowendoc River, a perennial river of the Manning River catchment runs through the location.

References

Suburbs of Mid-Coast Council